Basil Glendon Gabbidon (born 29 October 1955) is a British Jamaican guitarist / vocalist and a founding member of the reggae band Steel Pulse.

Gabbidon lives in Birmingham, England, and recorded the album Reggae Rockz with Paul Beckford (bass guitar), Colin Gabbidon (drums), Faisal X (keyboards), Sonia Clarke (vocals), Anne Marie Chambers (vocals), Candi Gabbidon (vocals) and other session musicians. The band has played at the Glade Festival, Irie Vibes Festival, Flyover Show as well as having a residency at The Public in West Bromwich.

References

1955 births
Living people
20th-century Black British male singers
British male guitarists
British reggae musicians
Musicians from Birmingham, West Midlands